Option pool shuffle relates to the allocation of shares to a venture capital (VC) investor at the point of investment, when also creating an Employee Share Option Pool at the same time. There are two different approaches to determine the number of shares to allocate to each investor, the VC Friendly Approach and the Founder Friendly Approach.

The VC Friendly approach
The VC Friendly approach, which may also be called a pre-money pool, gives the VC a greater share of the company. The Share Options are allocated first, and then the VC is allocated its shares. The impact is the VC share allocation dilutes the Share Option Pool and the VC ends up with a greater percentage of the company

The Founder Friendly approach
The Founder Friendly approach, which may also be called a post-money pool, gives the VC a smaller share of the company.  The VC are allocated their shares first. The impact is that the VC is diluted by the new Share Option Pool and the VC ends up with a smaller percentage of the company

Example
A company has 90,000 shares, and wants to (i) allocate 18,000 shares to a VC and (ii) create an Employee Share Option Pool (ESOP) of 10%.

The VC Friendly approach: 
1. The ESOP is created first - allocating 10% of the Company. So the ESOP gets 10,000 shares (10,000 / 100,000)
2. The VC is allocated its shares - 18,000 shares. The VC ends up with 15.25% of the company (18,000 / 118,000)
3. The ESOP ends up with 8.47% of the company (10,000/118,000)

The Founder Friendly approach:
1. The VC is allocated its shares - 18,000 shares.
2. The ESOP is created. There are now 108,000 shares outstanding, so the ESOP gets 12,000 shares, and has 10% of the company (12,000 / 120,000)
3. The VC ends up with 15% of the company. 0.25% less than the VC Friendly Approach

Ironically, the founders (existing shareholders) will end up with a smaller shareholding under the Founder Friendly Approach than the VC Friendly Approach, as more new shares will have been issued.

See also 
 Liquidation preference

References